Wujie Township is a rural township in the eastern part of Yilan County, Taiwan.

Geography

 Area: 38.87 km2
 Population: 40,750 people (February 2023)

Administrative divisions
The township comprises 15 villages: Chengxing, Daji, Erjie, Fuxing, Jinzhong, Jixin, Lize, Sanxing, Shangsi, Sijie, Wujie, Xiaowei, Xiehe, Zengan and Zhongxing.

Tourist attractions

 Chung Hsing Cultural and Creative Park
 Dongshan River Water Park
 Erjie Rice Barn
 Lizejian Yong'an Temple
 National Center for Traditional Arts

Festivals
 Yilan International Children's Folklore and Folkgame Festival

Transportation
The Erjie Station and Zhongli Station of Taiwan Railways is located in the township.

Notable natives
 Lin Yi-hsiung, Chairperson of Democratic Progressive Party (1998–2000)

External links

  

Townships in Yilan County, Taiwan